Eucharitolus pulcher is a species of longhorn beetles of the subfamily Lamiinae. It was described by Henry Walter Bates in 1885, and is known from Guatemala and Panama.

References

Beetles described in 1885
Acanthocinini